Thomas Broddyll was an administrator of the English East India Company. He served as President of Bengal in the eighteenth century.

References

Presidents of Bengal
English businesspeople